Eva Contreras Sandoval (born September 28, 1956 in Camotlán, municipality of Manzanillo, Colima) is a Mexican politician affiliated with the National Action Party (PAN) who  serves in the upper house of the Mexican Congress.

Political career
Contreras served as head of the Puerto Vallarta DIF during the municipal presidency of her husband. In 2006, she was elected a member (regidora) of the municipality of Puerto Vallarta. During the 2006 congressional elections she ran as substitute senator of candidate Alberto Cárdenas Jiménez; Cárdenas won the election but left that position to join President Caderón's cabinet, thus Contreras will be serving as substitute senator during the LX and LXI Legislatures (2006–2012).

References

1956 births
People from Manzanillo, Colima
Politicians from Colima
National Action Party (Mexico) politicians
Members of the Senate of the Republic (Mexico)
Living people
Women members of the Senate of the Republic (Mexico)
21st-century Mexican politicians
21st-century Mexican women politicians